Sultan Abdul Samad ibni Almarhum Raja Abdullah  (Jawi: سلطان عبد الصمد ابن المرحوم راج عبد الله ; born Raja Abdul Samad bin Raja Abdullah, 1804 - 6 February 1898) was the fourth Sultan of Selangor.

Raja Abdul Samad was born in 1804 at Bukit Melawati in Selangor son to Raja Abdullah ibni Almarhum Sultan Ibrahim Shah, the younger brother of Sultan Muhammad Shah. His reign lasted 41 years from 1857 until his death in 1898. His time on the throne saw the only civil war in Selangor, the establishment of Kuala Lumpur, the introduction of the Selangor flag and coat of arms and the start of British involvement in Selangor state affairs.

Rise to the throne
Before becoming the Sultan of Selangor, Abdul Samad held the title of Tengku Panglima Raja and held authority over Langat. The third sultan of Selangor, Sultan Muhammad Shah, died on 6 January 1857 without appointing an heir. This started a dispute between the royal court and dignitaries of Selangor to choose the next sultan. To select the next sultan Malay customs dictate that the son of a royal wife takes precedence over the sons of other wives. This makes Raja Mahmud the next legitimate heir but he was too young and was unable to exert his right. Sultan Muhammad's older and more competent sons, Raja Laut and Raja Sulaiman were sons of concubines, the Sultan's sons-in-law, Raja Jumaat and Raja Abdullah, were from the Riau branch of the family, hence they were all ineligible. This left Raja Abdul Samad, the nephew and son-in-law of the late Sultan, as the candidate with the strongest contention. Raja Jumaat and Raja Abdullah became convinced that they could become the power behind the throne if they supported Raja Abdul Samad to take the throne. With their patronage and the support of four other state dignitaries, a consensus was made to select the nephew of Sultan Muhammad Shah, Tengku Abdul Samad ibni Tengku Abdullah.

Other sources state that Selangor went on for two years without a sultan until he was favoured and that, unlike his predecessors, he was not formally installed by the Sultan of Perak.

Reign
Following the successful establishment of the Ampang tin mines by Muhamad Shah, Sultan Abdul Samad used the tin ore to trade with the states of the Straits Settlements. The mines in turn attracted even more Chinese miners with the help of Raja Abdullah bin Raja Jaafar, one of his sons-in-law and Yap Ah Loy, a Chinese Kapitan.

In 1866, the Sultan gave Raja Abdullah the power and authority over Klang. This fueled the feud between Raja Abdullah and Raja Mahadi, who was the previous administrator of Klang. The dispute led to the Klang War. The Sultan appointed his son-in-law, Tengku Dhiauddin Zainal Rashid (a.k.a. Tengku Kudin), as Vice Yamtuan and arbitrator twice during the war; first on 26 June 1868 and again on 22 July 1871. At the same time he handed over management of the entire state. He also provided Langat to Tengku Kudin to help him fund the handling of the war. Tengku Kudin in turn engaged the help of Pahang, mercenaries and Sir Andrew Clarke of the British Empire. This marked the first British involvement in local politics. The Sultan later handed over the ruling power of Klang to Tungku Kudin after the war was won in 1874. In 1878 Tengku Kudin stood down from this post.

After a number of piracy attacks took place in Selangor, Andrew Clarke assigned Frank Swettenham as a live-in advisor to Sultan Abdul Samad in August 1874. Sultan Abdul Samad accepted James Guthrie Davidson as the first British Resident of Selangor in 1875. In October the same year, Sultan Abdul Samad sent a letter to Andrew Clarke requesting for Selangor to be placed under the British protectorate.

During his reign, the areas of Semenyih, Beranang and Broga went under Selangor jurisdiction. Lukut however was handed to Dato' Kelana of Sungai Ujong on 30 July 1880. The Sultan was awarded the Order of St Michael and St George (KCMG) conferring the title Sir. Jugra became the royal capital of Selangor when Sultan Abdul Samad built the Jugra Palace and moved there in 1875. The state capital was moved from Klang to Kuala Lumpur in 1880.

In 1893, he helped found one of Malaysia's premier schools, Victoria Institution in Kuala Lumpur along with Kapitan Yap Kwan Seng, K. Thamboosamy and Loke Yew. Sultan Abdul Samad was made one of the first two patrons of the school.

Sultan Abdul Samad was a member of the Council of Rulers for the Federated Malay States, under the British colonial regime. The sultans of the four Federated Malay States of Perak, Selangor, Negeri Sembilan, and Pahang were represented at the first Durbar, which convened in 1897 at Kuala Kangsar, Perak.

Sultan Abdul Samad interacted openly with his people as observers noted that he mingled by chatting in local markets, while taking his daily walks or while watching a cockfight.

Death
Sultan Abdul Samad died on 6 February 1898 at the age of 93 after reigning for 41 years. He was laid to rest in his own mausoleum in Bukit Jugra. He had 12 children, 6 princes and 6 princesses from two wives. Raja Muda Raja Musa, the heir apparent, died in 1884. Hence next in line was Raja Muda Raja Musa's eldest son, Raja Sulaiman Shah ibni Raja Musa.

Legacy
The Sultan Abdul Samad Building in Kuala Lumpur, Sultan Abdul Samad Secondary School in Petaling Jaya, Sultan Abdul Samad Mosque in Kuala Lumpur International Airport (KLIA) and the Sultan Abdul Samad Library in Universiti Putra Malaysia are named after him.

References

1804 births
Malaysian people of Malay descent
1898 deaths
Malaysian people of Bugis descent
Honorary Knights Commander of the Order of St Michael and St George
Abdul Samad
19th-century monarchs in Asia